This is a list of tankers.  The list includes merchant tankers as well as naval tankers that do not fall into more specialized lists such as List of replenishment ships of the Royal Fleet Auxiliary and List of Type T2 Tanker names.

{| class="wikitable sortable" style="font-size:97%;"
|-
! Operators
! Origins
!Class or name
!width=120px|Builder
!Type
!Year Entered Service
!Year of Retirement
!Fate
|-
| Euronav NV
|  
| TI class supertankers/TI Oceania, formerly Hellespont Fairfax
| Daewoo Shipbuilding and Marine Engineering
| supertanker
| 2002
| 
| still active
|-
| Euronav NV
|  
| TI class supertankers/TI Europe, formerly Hellespont Tara
| Daewoo Shipbuilding and Marine Engineering
| supertanker
| 2002
| 
| still active
|-
| Overseas Shipping Group
| 
|  TI class supertankers/TI Asia, formerly Hellespont Alhambra
| Daewoo Shipbuilding and Marine Engineering
| supertanker
| 2002
| 2009
| converted to FSO 
|-
|
|  
| TI class supertankers/TI Africa, formerly Hellespont Metropolis
| Daewoo Shipbuilding and Marine Engineering
| supertanker
| 2002
| 2010
| converted to FSO
|-
| Maersk Line 
|  
| Maersk Peary
| STX Offshore & Shipbuilding
| polar tanker
| 2004
| 
| still active
|-
| Exxon
|  
| Exxon Valdez| National Steel and Shipbuilding Company
| supertanker
| 1986
| 
| converted to ore carrier and renamed Dong Fang Ocean|-
| BP
|  
| P-Class
| Samsung Heavy Industries
| Very Large Crude Carriers (VLCC)
| 1999-2000
| 
| still active - 4 vessels in class
|-
| BP
|  
| Tree Class
| Tsuneishi Shipbuilding Co.
| Aframax
| 2002-2004
| 
| still active - 8 vessels in class
|-
| BP
|  
| Bird Class
| Samsung Heavy Industries
| Aframax
| 2003-2006
| 
| still active - 12 vessels in class
|-
| BP
|  
| E-Class
| Hyundai Mipo Dockyard
| medium range products tanker
| 2003-2007
| 
| still active - 5 vessels in class
|-
| BP
|  
| Virtue Class
| Hyundai Mipo Dockyard
| large range product tanker
| 2004-2005
| 
| still active - 12 vessels in class
|-
| BP
|  
| C- Class
| Mitsubishi Heavy Industries
| liquefied petroleum gas (LPG) carrier
| 2006-2007
| 
| still active - 4 vessels in class
|-
| BP
|  
| Trader Class
| Samsung Heavy Industries
| LNG carrier
| 2002-2003
| 
| still active - 3 vessels in class
|-
| BP
|  
| GEM Class
| Hyundai Heavy Industries
| LNG carrier
| 2007-2008
| 
| still active - 4 vessels in class
|-
| Wilhelmsen Lines
| Singapore 
| LPG Gas Carriers/LPG/C Ayame, 
| Mitsubishi Heavy Industries
| LPG gas carrier
| 2010
| 
| still active
|-
| OOCL
| 
|Seawise Giant; later Knock Nevis, Jahre Viking, Happy Giant| Sumitomo Heavy Industries, Ltd.
| supertanker
| 1981
| 2009
| scrapped in Alang, India
|-
| 
| 
| Prairial; renamed Hellas Fos, renamed Sea Giant| Chantiers de l'Atlantique/Alstom Marine
| supertanker
| 1979
| 2003
| scrapped in Pakistan
|-
| 
| 
| Batillus class supertankers/Pierre Guillaumat; renamed Ulsan Master| Chantiers de l'Atlantique/Alstom Marine
| supertanker
| 1977
| 1983
| scrapped in Ulsan, South Korea
|-
| Esso International Shipping (Bahamas) Co Ltd, Nassau 
|  
| Esso Atlantic; renamed Kapetan Giannis
| Hitachi Zosen
| supertanker
| 1977
| 1990
| scrapped in Pakistan 2002
|-
| Esso Eastern Marine Ltd., Bermuda and Ceres Hellenic Shipping Enterprises Inc
| , 
| Esso Pacific; renamed Kapetan Michalis| Hitachi Zosen
| supertanker
| 1977
| 1990
| scrapped in Pakistan 2002
|-
| Nav Alta Italia
| 
| Ultra Large Crude Carrier/Nai Superba| Eriksbergs Mekaniska Verkstad
| supertanker
| 1978
| 2000
| scrapped in Chittagong Roads, Bangladesh
|-
| Nav Alta Italia
| 
| Ultra Large Crude Carrier/Nai Genova| Eriksbergs Mekaniska Verkstad
| supertanker
| 1978
| 2000
| scrapped in Alang, India
|-
| Société Maritime Shell France
| 
| Batillus class supertankers/Batillus| Chantiers de l'Atlantique/Alstom Marine
| supertanker
| 1976
| 1985
| scrapped in Kaohsiung, Taiwan
|-
| Zenit Tank AB
| 
| Ultra Large Crude Carrier/T/T Nanny| Uddevallavarvet
| supertanker
| 1978
| 2003
| scrapped in Jiangyin, China
|-
| Saléninvest AB
| 
| Ultra Large Crude Carrier/T/T Sea Saga| Kockums
| supertanker
| 1977
| 2003
| scrapped in China
|-
| Saléninvest, Sweden
| 
| Ultra Large Crude Carrier/Sea Serenade| Kockums
| supertanker
| 1976
| 1984
| decommissioned after hit by Iraqi rockets in the Gulf of Persia; aft was complete burnt out; scrapped in Kaohsiung, Taiwan
|-
| Salénrederierna, Sweden
| 
| Ultra Large Crude Carrier/Sea Symphony| Kockums
| supertanker
| 1975
| 2002
| scrapped in Bangladesh
|-
| Saléninvest, Sweden
| 
| Ultra Large Crude Carrier/Sea Song| Kockums
| supertanker
| 1977
|
| converted to FPSO named Kome Kribi 1
|-
| Salénrederierna, Sweden
| 
| Ultra Large Crude Carrier/Sea Saint| Kockums
| supertanker
| 1974
|
| converted to FPSO named Fluminense. Two active in a series of six.
|-
| Rederi AB Malmoil
| 
| Ultra Large Crude Carrier/Sea Scape| Kockums
| supertanker
| 1975
| 2002
| scrapped in Xinhui, China
|-
| Sture Ödner, Sweden
| 
| Ultra Large Crude Carrier/Sea Stratus| Kockums
| supertanker
| 1975
| 2000
| scrapped in Alang, India
|-
| Société Maritime Shell France
| 
| Batillus class supertankers/Bellamya| Chantiers de l'Atlantique/Alstom Marine
| supertanker
| 1976
| 1986
| scrapped in Ulsan, South Korea
|-
| Barracuda Tanker Corporation 
| /
| Torrey Canyon| Newport News Shipbuilding
| supertanker - first supertanker
| 1960?
| 1967
| wrecked 
|-
| Varun Shipping Company Pvt Ltd
|  
| LPG Gas Carriers/LPG/C Maharshi Shubhatreya, formerly LPG/C Libin| Mitsubishi Heavy Industries
| LPG gas carrier
| 1982
| 
| still active
|-
| Varun Shipping Company Pvt Ltd
|  
| LPG Gas Carriers/LPG/C Maharshi Bhardwaj, formerly LPG/C Nordanger| Hyundai Heavy Industries
| LPG gas carrier
| 1992
| 
| still active 
|-
| Varun Shipping Company Pvt Ltd
|  
| LPG Gas Carriers/LPG/C Maharshi Labhatreya, formerly LPG/C Hector| Moss Verft

| LPG gas garrier
| 1984 

| 
| sold to Mount Risho Investments for $12 mill for storage project in Africa
|}

Former supertankers converted into Mercy class hospital ships
USNS Mercy, formerly SS WorthUSNS Comfort, formerly SS Rose City'' (MA-301)

References

See also

List of oil spills

Tankers